Florian Stetter (born Munich, August 2, 1977) is a German actor.

Awards

References

External links

20th-century German male actors
1977 births
German male film actors
Male actors from Munich
Living people